Hanks is an unincorporated community in Williams County, North Dakota, United States.

Geography 
Hanks is located on North Dakota Highway 50, and has the latitude of 48.603° N, and the longitude of −103.802° W.
The elevation is 2,116 feet (645 m), and is located in the Central Time Zone.

History 
Hanks was founded in 1916 along a Great Northern Railway branch line that ran from Stanley to Grenora. The name honors W.F. Hanks, a banker from Powers Lake.

Hanks disincorporated in 1992.

According to a 2008 report, Hanks had only one inhabitant. The town was included in the National Geographic article The Emptied Prairie, published in January 2008.

Notable people 
A. R. Shaw, educator and legislator

References 

Former municipalities in North Dakota
Unincorporated communities in Williams County, North Dakota
Unincorporated communities in North Dakota
Populated places disestablished in 1992